Brandon Jay Costner (born July 21, 1987) is an American professional basketball player, currently a free agent. He most recently played for Puerto Rican teams Grises de Humacao and Santeros de Aguada of the Baloncesto Superior Nacional. He played college basketball at North Carolina State University.

College career
Just five games into the 2005–06 season, Costner sustained a season-ending injury, earning a medical redshirt and therefore making 2006–07 his freshman season. His highest scoring game was in the 2007 ACC Tournament against Duke in which he scored 30 points in the Wolfpack victory.

Professional career
In March 2009, Costner announced that he would forgo his senior season at North Carolina State and enter the 2009 NBA draft. After going undrafted, he joined the Chicago Bulls for the 2009 NBA Summer League. Later that year, he signed with Belfius Mons-Hainaut of Belgium for the 2009–10 season.

In November 2010, he was acquired by the Utah Flash as they selected him with the 8th pick in the 2010 NBA D-League Draft.

In November 2011, he was acquired by the Los Angeles D-Fenders. Following the conclusion of the 2011–12 D-League season, he joined Limoges CSP Elite of France for the remainder of their season.

In November 2013, he was re-acquired by the Los Angeles D-Fenders.

In July 2016, he signed with the Guizhou White Tigers for the 2016 NBL season.

On February 8, 2017, he re-joined the Caciques de Humacao.

In May, 2017, he signed with Hebei Xianglan of China for the 2017 NBL season.

In January 2018, Costner signed with Champville SC of the Lebanese Basketball League.

In May 2021, he joined Rwandan team Patriots BBC to play in the 2021 BAL season.

BAL statistics

|-
|style="text-align:left;"|2021
|style="text-align:left;"|Patriots
| 6 || 5 || 25.5 || .400 || .364 || .667 || 4.5 || 2.7 || .7 || .0 || 11.0
|- class="sortbottom"
| style="text-align:center;" colspan="2"|Career
| 6 || 5 || 25.5 || .400 || .364 || .667 || 4.5 || 2.7 || .7 || .0 || 11.0

Personal life
Costner is the son of former St. Joseph's and professional player Tony Costner.

References

External links
NBA D-League Profile
DraftExpress.com Profile
NC State bio
RealGM.com Profile

1987 births
Living people
Patriots BBC players
African-American basketball players
American expatriate basketball people in Belgium
American expatriate basketball people in China
American expatriate basketball people in France
American expatriate basketball people in Hong Kong
American expatriate basketball people in Japan
American expatriate basketball people in Rwanda
American men's basketball players
ASEAN Basketball League players
Basketball players from New Jersey
Belfius Mons-Hainaut players
Caciques de Humacao players
Nanjing Tongxi Monkey Kings players
Eastern Sports Club basketball players
Limoges CSP players
Los Angeles D-Fenders players
McDonald's High School All-Americans
NC State Wolfpack men's basketball players
Parade High School All-Americans (boys' basketball)
People from Montclair, New Jersey
Power forwards (basketball)
Seton Hall Preparatory School alumni
Sportspeople from Essex County, New Jersey
Utah Flash players
Yokohama B-Corsairs players